Dumfriesshire, Clydesdale and Tweeddale is a constituency of the House of Commons, located in the South of Scotland, within the Dumfries and Galloway, South Lanarkshire and Scottish Borders council areas. It elects one Member of Parliament (MP) at least once every five years using the First-past-the-post system of voting. It is currently represented in Westminster by the former Secretary of State for Scotland, David Mundell, a Conservative, who has been the MP since 2005.

The seat has a diverse electoral history, with the Dumfriesshire area being a longtime Conservative seat, the Clydesdale area being formerly safe Labour territory, and Tweeddale had been part of Liberal Democrat-voting constituencies since the 1980s. Former Scottish Secretary, David Mundell has held the seat since 2005, and from 2005 to 2017 was the only Conservative MP in Scotland.

It is a predominantly rural environment and the only large settlements are the towns of: Dumfries, Annan, Biggar, Gretna/Gretna Green, Langholm, Lockerbie, Moffat and Peebles.

Boundaries 

As created by the Fifth Review of the Boundary Commission for Scotland the constituency is one of six covering the Dumfries and Galloway council area, the Scottish Borders council area and the South Lanarkshire council area. The other five constituencies are: Berwickshire, Roxburgh and Selkirk, Dumfries and Galloway, East Kilbride, Strathaven and Lesmahagow, Lanark and Hamilton East and Rutherglen and Hamilton West.

The Dumfriesshire, Clydesdale and Tweeddale constituency is predominantly rural, and the terms of the name refer to the former local government county of Dumfries, the Clydesdale area of the South Lanarkshire council area and the Tweeddale area of the Scottish Borders council area. The Dumfriesshire, Clydesdale and Tweeddale constituency excludes, however, most of the town of Dumfries, which is within the Dumfries and Galloway constituency.

The constituency covers the electoral wards of:

South Lanarkshire: Clydesdale East, Clydesdale South (in part)
Scottish Borders: Tweeddale East, Tweeddale West (in part)
Dumfries and Galloway: Mid and Upper Nithsdale, Annandale North, Annandale East and Eskdale, Annandale South, Nith (part), Lochar (part).

Political history

The seat's main predecessor seats, Dumfriesshire, Clydesdale and Tweeddale, Ettrick & Lauderdale, all had distinct political influences. Dumfriesshire had been a Conservative/National Liberal seat from 1931 to 1997, but was lost to Labour's Russell Brown at the 1997 general election, in which the Conservatives lost all their Scottish seats.

Clydesdale had been a safe Labour seat since the 1980s, and Tweeddale, Ettrick and Lauderdale had been a Liberal/Liberal Democrat seat since 1983.

Following the boundary review for the 2005 general election, Labour held a clear majority of 12% over the Conservatives, according to calculations of notional results (an estimate of how the seat would have voted if it had existed at the previous election) and the seat was 96th on the Conservatives' target list. The Liberal Democrats finished in a close third place at the election. However, former Conservative MSP David Mundell was successful in gaining the seat from Labour, with a swing of 8.0%. This left him as the sole Conservative MP representing a Scottish constituency at the 2005 general election, after the Conservative MP for Galloway and Upper Nithsdale, Peter Duncan was defeated when standing at the new Dumfries and Galloway constituency, and Conservative attempts to gain Angus from the SNP ended in failure.

In 2010, Mundell was re-elected, with an increased majority. In 2015, after the SNP landslide victory in Scotland, he narrowly defeated the SNP candidate, Emma Harper by 798 votes, and was the only Scottish Conservative MP elected. However, following the SNP's losses at the 2017 snap general election, the Conservatives gained 12 seats in Scotland, with Mundell increasing his majority to 9,441 votes. Mundell was re-elected at the 2019 general election, but with a reduced majority, in an election where the SNP made gains across Scotland at the expense of Labour and the Conservatives.

Members of Parliament

Election results

Elections in the 2010s

Elections in the 2000s

External links 
The boundaries of the constituency, and its predecessors, can be viewed at Scottish Boundaries Commission's Map Browser.
The boundaries of the constituency can also be viewed at the Ordnance Survey's Election Maps site.

References

Westminster Parliamentary constituencies in Scotland
Constituencies of the Parliament of the United Kingdom established in 2005
Politics of South Lanarkshire
Politics of Dumfries and Galloway
Politics of the Scottish Borders